Olivella lindae is a species of small sea snail, marine gastropod mollusk in the subfamily Olivellinae, in the family Olividae, the olives.  Species in the genus Olivella are commonly called dwarf olives.

This is a nomen nudum.

Description
The shell grows to a length of 10 mm.

Distribution
This species occurs in the Caribbean Sea off Venezuela.

References

lindae
Gastropods described in 1992